The 2016 Asia Rugby Sevens Series is the eighth edition of Asia's continental sevens tournament. It was played over three legs hosted in Hong Kong, South Korea, and Sri Lanka. The top two teams besides Japan qualifying for the 2017 Hong Kong Sevens for a chance to win a place as a World Rugby Sevens Series core team.

The size of the series has been reduced from twelve teams in 2015 to eight teams in 2016. The Asia Rugby Development Sevens Series, held over two legs in India and the United Arab Emirates, served as a qualifier, with the winner qualifying for the main series.

Teams

Asia Rugby Development Sevens Series

 
 
 
 
 
 
 
 
 
 
 
 
 

Asia Rugby Sevens Series

Development Series

Chennai Leg

All matches were held at Nehru Jawaharlal Stadium in Chennai, India

Pool A

Pool B

Knockout Stage

9th/10th Place Playoff

Plate

Cup

Al Ain Leg
All matches were held at Al Ain Amblers RFC in Al Ain, United Arab Emirates

First Round

Pool A

Pool B

Pool C

Second Round

Pool D

Pool E

Pool F

Final Round

Bowl

Plate

Cup

Final standings

Main series

Hong Kong

All matches will be held at the Hong Kong Football Club Stadium. All times are Hong Kong Time(UTC+8)

Pool A

Pool B

Plate Semifinals

Cup Semifinals

Korea

All Matches will be held at Namdong Asiad Rugby Stadium. All times are Korea Standard Time (UTC+9)

Pool A

Pool B

Plate Semifinals

Cup Semifinals

Colombo

All matches will be held at Race Course International Rugby Stadium. All times are Sri Lanka Standard Time (UTC+5:30)

Pool A

Pool B

Plate Semifinals

Cup Semifinals

Final standings

References

    
2016
2016 rugby sevens competitions
2016 in Asian rugby union